Pamban is a town on Pamban Island in the Indian state of Tamil Nadu.

Pamban may also refer to:
Pamban Bridge, a bridge on the Palk Strait which connects Rameswaram on Pamban Island to mainland India
Pamban Island, an island located in the Palk Strait between mainland India and Sri Lanka
 Pamban Lighthouse, on Pamban Island
 Pamban Swamigal (18481929), Saivite saint and poet

See also